Çukurova Basketbol Kulübü, for sponsorship reasons Çukurova Basketbol Kulübü Mersin Yenişehir Belediyesi, is a Turkish women's basketball club based in Mersin, Turkey. The club was founded in 2017 and currently competing in the Women's Basketball Super League.

History
The club was founded in May 2017 with the purchase of the competitor rights from Girne Üniversitesi. After competing in the play-off semi finals in their first season, the club played in the play-off finals against Fenerbahçe in the 2018–19 season. The club lost to Fenerbahçe in the finals, but qualified to compete in EuroLeague Women in the 2019–20 season.

Current roster

Honours
 Turkish Super League
Runners-up (2): 2018–19, 2021–22

 Turkish Cup
 Winners (1): 2022

Notable players

Lara Sanders  (1 season: '19-'20)
Pelin Bilgiç (1 season: '18-'19)
Şaziye İvegin (1 season: '18-'19)
Gökşen Fitik (4 season: '17-'21)
Sevgi Uzun (1 season: '18-'19)

Brittney Sykes (1 season: '19-'20)
Chelsea Gray (1 season: '18-'19)
Diamond DeShields (1 season: '17-'18)
Erlana Larkins (1 season: '17-'18)
Jantel Lavender (1 season: '19-'20)
Kelsey Bone (1 season: '18-'19)
Morgan Tuck (1 season: '19-'20)
Nia Coffey (1 season: '19-'20)

Alex Bentley  (1 season: '19-'20)

Kim Mestdagh (1 season: '18-'19)

Gabriela Mărginean (1 season: '19-'20)

Astou Ndour (1 season: '18-'19)
Leonor Rodríguez (1 season: '19-'20)

Alina Iagupova (3 season: '17-'19, '20-'21)
Liudmyla Naumenko (3 season: '17-'19, '20-'21)

References

External links
 Official website 
 Turkish Basketball Federation 
 Eurobasket team page

Women's basketball teams in Turkey
Sport in Mersin
Basketball teams established in 2017
2017 establishments in Turkey